The South Africa women's national water polo team represents the South Africa in international women's water polo competitions and friendly matches.

Results

Olympic Games

2020 – 10th place

World Championship

 2009 — 16th place
 2011 — 15th place
 2013 — 15th place
 2015 — 16th place
 2017 — 16th place
 2019 — 14th place
 2022 – 13th place

World Cup

 2014 – 7th place
 2018 – 8th place

Current squad
Roster for the 2020 Summer Olympics.

Under-20 team
South Africa lastly competed at the 2021 FINA Junior Water Polo World Championships.

References

External links
Official website

Women's national water polo teams
W